Aurora is a serif typeface, designed by Jackson Burke (the successor to Chauncey H. Griffith at Mergenthaler Linotype) in 1960. The font is a darker derivative of the Corona typeface, initially designed for the Canada NewsWire.

The News 706 typeface by Bitstream Inc. is almost identical to Aurora.

References
Macmillan, Neil. An A-Z of Type Designers. Yale University Press.: 2006. ,

External links 
Font Designer - Jackson Burke

Transitional serif typefaces
Corporate typefaces
Newspaper and magazine typefaces
Typefaces and fonts introduced in 1960
Typefaces designed by Jackson Burke